¡Bastardos! is an American jam band Blues Traveler's eighth studio album, released on September 13, 2005, and produced by Jay Bennett (formerly of Wilco).

The band stated in an interview years ago that they wanted to name an album "Those Bastards!"; that manifested in this album's title.

Track listing
"You Can't Stop Thinking About Me" (Chan Kinchla, John Popper) – 4:24
"Amber Awaits" (Chan and Tad Kinchla, Popper) – 3:47
"After What" (Popper, Wilson) – 3:34
"Money Back Guarantee" (Popper, Wilson) – 3:48
"Can't Win True Love" (Popper) – 4:57
"Nail" (Popper, Wilson) – 3:06
"Leaning In" (Popper, Wilson) – 3:48
"She and I" (Tad Kinchla, Popper) – 4:51
"Rubberneck" (Tad Kinchla, Popper) – 3:11
"Nefertiti" (Tad Kinchla, Popper) – 4:15
"What Could Possibly Go Wrong" (Chan Kinchla, Popper) – 2:47
"That Which Doesn't Kill You" (Chan Kinchla, Popper) – 4:12
"She Isn't Mine" (Popper) – 3:18
"The Children of the Night" (Brendan Hill, Popper) – 6:31

Personnel
John Popper – harmonica, vocals
Chan Kinchla – electric and acoustic guitars, mandolin
Brendan Hill – percussion, drums
Tad Kinchla – bass
Ben Wilson – keyboards
Jay Bennett – production, guitar, percussion
Teresa Cole – backing vocals
Carlos Sosa – saxophone
Fernando Castillo – trumpet
Raul Vallejo – trombone

¡Bastardos en Vivo!
On August 29, 2006, ¡Bastardos en Vivo!, an EP containing live recordings of several songs from ¡Bastardos!, was released. It also includes a rendition of the Charlie Daniels Band's southern rock song, "The Devil Went Down to Georgia".

References

External links
¡Bastardos! Review on Everythingrock.com

Blues Traveler albums
2005 albums
Vanguard Records albums
Albums produced by Jay Bennett